The silver hatchetfish (Gasteropelecus levis) is a member of the genus Gasteropelecus in the family Gasteropelecidae. It is a relatively small fish that is often kept in aquariums. It is compressed laterally, with black and gold lines running along its side, adults will grow up to 3.5 cm in the wild and 6 cm in the aquarium.

In the aquarium
It has the capability of "flying" out of an aquarium, so precautions should be taken. It uses the ability to "fly" to catch insects.

See also
List of freshwater aquarium fish species

References

 

Gasteropelecidae
Taxa named by Carl H. Eigenmann
Fish described in 1909